Eshaqabad (also Romanized as Esḩāqābād; also known as Is-Hāqabād, Sāghābād, and Sāqābād) is a village in Bala Velayat Rural District, in the Central District of Kashmar County, Razavi Khorasan Province, Iran. At the 2006 census, its population was 674, in 167 families.

References 

Populated places in Kashmar County